Czech Lion Award for Best Foreign Film was awards given to the best non-Czech motion picture. It was discontinued in 2014.

Winners

References

Film awards for Best Foreign Language Film
Czech Lion Awards
Awards established in 1993